Dylan Jacobs (born June 15, 2000) is an American distance runner competing for Tennessee Volunteers. He is a three-time NCAA Champion.

High School Career 
Jacobs attended Carl Sandburg High School in Orland Park, Illinois. His sophomore  yeah he won the state cross country meet and helped the team to a fourth-place finish at Nike Cross Nationals. His junior year, he finished 11th at the Footlocker Nationals and followed it up with a second place finish in the 4×800 relay at the Illinois state meet. As a Senior he was the 2017 Footlocker Nationals individual champion, and won the 1600m and 4×800 relay at the Illinois state meet.

Collegiate Career 
Notre Dame

In Jacobs freshman year at Notre Dame he ran the 1200m leg of their NCAA Championship winning DMR team along side Edward Cheatham, Samuel Voelz and Yared Nuguse. The following indoor season that same team ran the NCAA's second fastest DMR ever at the Alex Wilson Invitational.

Jacobs finished his junior year of cross country by placing 20th at the NCAA Championships helping the Irish run to a second place finish behind Northern Arizona. That spring in track he finished 11th at the NCAA Championships running a 13:25.65 5,000m to break the school record.

In his final year at Notre Dame Dylan finished 10th at the NCAA Cross Country Championships. He finished his time at Notre Dame by winning the 10,000m at the NCAA Championships. During the race Jacobs fell down but got back up and passed Abdihamid Nur during a 55.45 second last lap finishing i na time of 28:12.32.

Transfer to Tennessee

In June of 2022 Jacobs Coach at Notre Dame, Sean Carlson, announced he was leaving Notre Dame to coach at the University of Tennessee. In July, Jacobs announced via his Instagram that he was transferring to the Tennessee. That fall, he finished 4th place at the NCAA Cross Country Championships.

2023 Indoor Season

Jacobs started his 2023 Indoor season by breaking the American collegiate record in the Indoor 5000m by running 13:11.01 at the Terrier Classic on January 27th. Two weeks later he ran the second fastest collegiate 3000m by finishing in 7:36.89 at the Millrose Games. His time was less than half a second off the record which was set two weeks earlier by Northern Arizona runner Drew Bosley.

Jacobs won the SEC championship in the DMR and 3000m.

At the NCAA Indoor Championships Jacobs took the lead in the 5000m with 450 meters to go and ultimately won the race in 13:37.59, a facility and NCAA altitude record. Later in the meet he finished 6th in the 3000m by running 7:52.25. Following the meet the USTFCCA named him the South Region Men's Track Athlete of the Year for the 2022-23 indoor season.

Results and Personal Records 
Results taken from IAAF Profile.

Notable Results

Personal Records

See Also 

 Profile at World Athletics
 List of United States collegiate records in track and field

References

External links
 

2000 births
American male long-distance runners
Tennessee Volunteers men's track and field athletes
Living people
21st-century American people
Track and field athletes from Illinois
Notre Dame Fighting Irish athletes
Notre Dame Fighting Irish men's track and field athletes